Paraclinus fehlmanni is a species of labrisomid blenny only known from the Pacific coast of Ecuador where it is found in tide pools down to depths of . The specific name honours the ichthyologist and herpetologist Herman Adair Fehlmann (1917-2005) who worked at the Smithsonian Oceanographic Sorting Center and who, among collecting many other specimens, collected the type of this species.

References

fehlmanni
Fish described in 1969
Fish of Ecuador
Taxa named by Victor G. Springer